José Manuel Marques Postiga (born 3 May 1996) is a Portuguese footballer who plays for Merelinense F.C. as a forward.

Club career

Sporting
Born in Vila do Conde, Postiga joined Sporting CP in 2009 at the age of 13, from local Varzim SC. In August 2014, while still a junior, he was included in the B team's 18-man squad for the Segunda Liga match away to S.C. Farense, the opening day of the season. He made his competition debut on the 10th, coming on as an 87th-minute substitute for Filipe Chaby in a 0–1 loss.

Additionally, Postiga competed with the academy in the UEFA Youth League and scored twice in an eventual group stage exit, starting with a penalty kick in a 3–1 win at NK Maribor.

Rio Ave
On 27 June 2015, Postiga signed a three-year contract with Rio Ave FC. On 12 January of the following year, having not featured at all in competitive games, he returned to the second division after being loaned to nearby Varzim for the remainder of the season. Eleven days later, he made his debut for his new team, replacing Elísio for the final 23 minutes of a 4–0 win at Leixões SC. his only goal for the Poveiros came in his final game on 8 May, concluding a 2–0 win at relegated Clube Oriental de Lisboa again from the bench.

Postiga returned to the second tier on 6 August 2016, joining Académico de Viseu F.C. on loan for the upcoming season. A year later he was loaned to S.C. Salgueiros in the Campeonato de Portugal and, halfway through that campaign, he joined F.C. Felgueiras 1932 of the same league in the same manner.

Later years
Postiga departed for C.D. Trofense in 2019, having not made a first-team appearance for his hometown club. In February 2020 he signed again for Varzim, where he was assigned to the reserves. Eight months later, he joined division three side Brito SC, and remained there in the ensuing seasons with F.C. Pedras Rubras and Merelinense FC.

International career
Postiga scored a hat-trick for Portugal on 29 September 2012 in a 4–2 win over Iceland at the Ta' Qali National Stadium in qualification for the 2013 European Under-17 Championship.

Personal life
Postiga's older brother, Hélder, was also a footballer and forward. He too represented Sporting and Rio Ave, also being a longtime Portugal international.

Their father's cousin, Armindo, a member at Rio Ave, died in a fishing shipwreck off Figueira da Foz in August 2015.

References

External links

Portuguese League profile 

1996 births
Living people
People from Vila do Conde
Portuguese footballers
Association football forwards
Liga Portugal 2 players
Campeonato de Portugal (league) players
Varzim S.C. players
Sporting CP B players
Rio Ave F.C. players
Académico de Viseu F.C. players
S.C. Salgueiros players
F.C. Felgueiras 1932 players
C.D. Trofense players
F.C. Pedras Rubras players
Merelinense F.C. players
Portugal youth international footballers
Sportspeople from Porto District